Local elections were held in Batanes on May 9, 2022, as part of the 2022 Philippine general election. Voters will select candidates for all local positions: a town mayor, vice mayor and town councilors, as well as members of the Sangguniang Panlalawigan, a vice-governor, a governor and a representative for the province's at-large congressional district in the House of Representatives.

The province's election turnout is 85.39%, (34 election returns) equivalent to 11,801 of 13,820  total registered voters.

Provincial elections

Gubernatorial election 

Incumbent Batanes Governor Malou Cayco is seeking re-election for a third and final term against former Governor Telesforo Castillejos.

By municipality

Vice gubernatorial election 

Incumbent Vice Governor Ignacio Villa is seeking re-election for a second term against incumbent first provincial district board member Ferdie Elica and incumbent Ivana mayor Leonardo "Ading" Hostallero.

Provincial board elections

1st District
Municipality: Basco, Mahatao

|colspan=5 bgcolor=black|

2nd District
Municipality: Itbayat, Ivana, Sabtang, Uyugan

|colspan=5 bgcolor=black|

Congressional election
Incumbent Batanes lone district representative Ciriaco “Doc” Gato Jr. is seeking re-election for a second term against Luis Abad who is the son of former Budget Secretary Florencio Abad, and former lone district representative Dina Abad.

Municipal elections
The mayor and vice mayor with the highest number of votes win the seat; they are voted separately, therefore, they may be of different parties when elected. Parties are as stated in their certificates of candidacy.

Basco
In Basco, the provincial capital, the municipal election will be contested primarily between candidates from the Liberal Party (LP), Lakas-CMD, and the Nationalist People's Coalition (NPC).

Mayor
Incumbent Basco mayor Demy Narag is running for re-election against incumbent vice mayor German "Milo" Caccam.

Vice mayor
Incumbent vice mayor German "Milo" Caccam is running for mayor. The Liberal Party which is the party of Milo Caccam nominated Marvin Costales for vice mayor.

Municipal council

|colspan=5 bgcolor=black|

Itbayat
In Itbayat,  the municipal election will be contested primarily between Independent candidates.

Mayor
Incumbent mayor Ronald Gutierrez is running for the position of vice mayor. Sabas De Sagon, the relative and namesake of Raul De Sagon runs for mayor.

Vice mayor
Incumbent Itbayat mayor Ronald Gutierrez is running for vice mayor.

Municipal council

|colspan=5 bgcolor=black|

Ivana
In Ivana,  the municipal election will be contested primarily between the Liberal Party (LP), Lakas-CMD, the Nationalist People's Coalition (NPC), and Independent candidates.

Mayor
Incumbent Ivana mayor Leonardo Hostallero is running for Vice governor in the province of Batanes and incumbent Vice mayor Romeo Emilio Fidel is running for mayor.

Vice mayor
Incumbent vice mayor Romeo Fidel is running for mayor. The Nationalist People's Coalition which is the party of Romeo Fidel nominated Jerry Agana for vice mayor.

Municipal council

|colspan=5 bgcolor=black|

Mahatao
In Mahatao, the municipal election will be contested primarily between the Partido para sa Demokratikong Reporma (Reporma), and the Liberal Party (LP).

Mayor
Incumbent Mahatao mayor Pedro Poncio is seeking re-election for a second term.

Vice mayor
Incumbent vice mayor Noe Avelino Fabro is seeking re-election for a third and final term.

Municipal council

|colspan=5 bgcolor=black|

Sabtang
In Sabtang, the municipal election will be contested primarily between the Partido para sa Demokratikong Reporma (Reporma), the Liberal Party (LP), and the Nationalist People's Coalition (NPC).

Mayor
Incumbent Sabtang mayor Maxilindo Emilio Babalo is ineliglible to run for another term. Prescila Babalo, a relative of Maxilindo will attempt to replace his position.

Vice mayor
Incumbent vice mayor Manjing Alavado is seeking re-election for a second term.

Municipal council

|colspan=5 bgcolor=black|

Uyugan
In Uyugan, the municipal election will be contested primarily between the Liberal Party (LP), and Lakas-CMD.

Mayor
Incumbent Uyugan mayor Jonathan Nanud is seeking re-election for a third and final term.

Vice mayor
Incumbent vice mayor Baldo Baldomar is seeking re-election for a second term.

Municipal council

|colspan=5 bgcolor=black|

References

2022 Philippine local elections
Batanes
May 2022 events in the Philippines